Ernie Watson (3 December 1896 – 2 May 1976) was an Australian rules footballer who played with Fitzroy in the Victorian Football League (VFL).

Notes

External links 
		

1896 births
1976 deaths
Australian rules footballers from Victoria (Australia)
Fitzroy Football Club players